Leonard Keith Lawson (1927 – 29 November 2003), was a bestselling Australian comic book creator, successful commercial artist and photographer. However, he was also a notorious criminal who was sentenced to life imprisonment for rape and murder. He died in custody in 2003.
                     
Lawson first came to prominence as the creator of The Lone Avenger, an Australian comic book hero, whose first appearance was in the second issue of Action Comics in 1946, running for thirteen years, eventually taking over the entire comic and selling up to 70,000 copies. Lawson also created another masked Western vigilante hero The Hooded Rider, as well as Diana, Queen of the Apes and Peter Fury.

In 1954, Lawson took five young models to bushland in Terrey Hills to take swimsuit photos for a calendar. He bound the women and sexually assaulted them, raping two. He was sentenced to death, which was commuted to 14 years in prison when the death penalty was abolished in New South Wales later that year. Lawson asked to continue producing The Lone Avenger in prison, but it was handed to another artist. The comic was subsequently banned in Queensland and withdrawn by its publisher. Lawson was released from prison in 1961 after serving seven years, or half, of his sentence.

On 7 November 1962, Lawson sexually assaulted and murdered a 16-year-old girl whose portrait he was painting in his apartment. The next day, he took several hostages at the Sydney Church of England Girls' Grammar School, killing a 15-year-old girl in the ensuing siege. He was sentenced to life imprisonment. Lawson attacked a female dancer who performed in a concert at Parramatta jail, seemingly as part of an escape attempt. He died in Grafton Correctional Centre in November 2003.

References

External links 
 
 
 
 

1927 births
2003 deaths
Australian commercial artists
Australian comics writers
Australian illustrators
Australian comics artists
Australian rapists
Australian people convicted of murder
Australian prisoners sentenced to death
Prisoners sentenced to life imprisonment by New South Wales
Prisoners who died in New South Wales detention
Australian people who died in prison custody